The Wedding is an 1889 Russian one-act play by Anton Chekhov.

Roles
 Evdokim Zaharovitch Zhigalov
 Nastasya Timofeyevna
 Dashenka
 Epaminond Maximovitch Aplombov
 Fyodor Yakovlevitch Revunov-Karaulov
 Andrey Andreyevitch Nunin
 Anna Martinovna Zmeyukina
 Ivan Mihailovitch Yats
 Harlampi Spiridonovitch Dimba
 Dmitri Stepanovitch Mozgovoy

See also
 The Wedding (1944 film)

References

External links
 Costume sketches, character descriptions, and set design by Motley Theatre Design Group for the 1951 production at The Old Vic - Motley Collection of Theatre & Costume Design

Plays by Anton Chekhov
1889 plays
One-act plays
Russian plays adapted into films